George Cherry was a Member of Parliament for Dunwich from 1820 to 1826.  

Between 1829 and 1830 he was the High Sheriff of Berkshire when he was living at Denford Park.

His father, George Frederick Cherry was British Resident at Oudh, murdered by Wazir Ali Khan in 1799. One of his sons, George Cherry, was an English cricketer. Another son Major General Apsley Cherry-Garrard was the father of the polar explorer Apsley Cherry-Garrard.

References

UK MPs 1820–1826
MPs for rotten boroughs